Ancylosis pallidimarginalis is a species of snout moth in the genus Ancylosis. It was described by Walter Rothschild in 1915, and is known from Algeria.

The wingspan is 23 mm.

References

Moths described in 1915
pallidimarginalis
Endemic fauna of Algeria
Moths of Africa